Six of Hearts is the first EP by saxophonist Kenny G. It is a compilation album, released as a Limited Edition by Arista Records in 1997.

Track listing

References

External links

1997 EPs
Kenny G compilation albums
Arista Records EPs
1997 compilation albums